Professor John Joseph Scarisbrick MBE FRHistS (often shortened to J.J. Scarisbrick) is a British historian who taught at the University of Warwick. He is also noted as the co-founder with his wife Nuala Scarisbrick of Life, a British anti-abortion charity founded in 1970.

Born in 1928 in London, Scarisbrick was educated at The John Fisher School and later Christ's College, Cambridge, after spending two years in the Royal Air Force. He specialises in Tudor history and his most critically acclaimed work is Henry VIII, first published in 1968.

He received an MBE in 2015 for services to vulnerable people as founder of Zoe's Place, a hospice for children in Coventry.

References

1928 births
Alumni of Christ's College, Cambridge
Academics of the University of Warwick
Living people
Fellows of the Royal Historical Society
Fellows of the Royal Society of Literature
Members of the Order of the British Empire
British anti-abortion activists